Backusella is the sole genus of zygote fungi in the family Backusellaceae, which is classified in the order Mucorales. Members of this genus have been often isolated from plant litter, from locations around the world.

Taxonomy
C. W. Hesseltine and J. J. Ellis recognised the uniqueness of a new species, B. circina, warranted its classification in a new genus; in 1969 they established Backusella, named in honour of Professor M. P. Backus. Since then, several species previously placed in the archetypal mucoralean genus Mucor were reassessed, found to be close relatives of B. circina, and combined into Backusella as additional Backusella species, while other species were discovered and classified outright as Backusella. K. Voigt & P.M. Kirk established the family Backusellaceae to include Backusella in 2012, as they likewise recognised the uniqueness of the genus and the need to classify it within a distinct family.

Accepted species
The genus consists of the following 27 accepted species:

 Backusella australiensis Urquhart & Douch
 Backusella azygospora T.R.L. Cordeiro et al.
 Backusella chlamydospora Hyang B. Lee & T.T.T. Nguyen
 Backusella circina J.J. Ellis & Hesselt. – generic type species
Synonym: Mucor pseudolamprosporus H. Nagan. & Hirahara
Synonym: B. johorensis L.S. Loh et al.
 Backusella constricta D.X. Lima et al.
 Backusella dispersa (Hagem) Urquhart & Douch
Basionym: M. dispersus Hagem
 Backusella gigacellularis J.I. Souza et al.
 Backusella granulispora L.S. Loh & Kuthub.
 Backusella indica (Baijal & B.S. Mehrotra) Walther & de Hoog
Basionym: M. recurvus var. indicus [as  'indica' ] Baijal & B.S. Mehrotra
 Backusella koreana Hyang B. Lee et al.
 Backusella lamprospora (Lendn.) Benny & R.K. Benj. (1975)
Basionym: M. lamprosporus Lendn.
Synonym: B. circina var. lamprospora (Lendn.) R.Y. Zheng
 Backusella liffmaniae Urquhart & Douch
 Backusella locustae Hyang B. Lee et al.
 Backusella luteola Urquhart & Douch
 Backusella macrospora Urquhart & Douch
 Backusella mclennaniae Urquhart & Douch
 Backusella morwellensis Urquhart & Douch
 Backusella oblongielliptica (H. Nagan. et al. ex Pidopl. & Milko) Walther & de Hoog
Basionym: M. oblongiellipticus H. Nagan. et al. ex Pidopl. & Milko
 Backusella oblongispora (Naumov) Walther & de Hoog
Basionym: M. oblongisporus Naumov
 Backusella parvicylindrica Urquhart & Douch
 Backusella psychrophila Urquhart & Douch
 Backusella recurva (E.E. Butler) Walther & de Hoog
Basionym: M. recurvus E.E. Butler
Synonym: M. recurvus var. aspinosus L.S. Loh
Synonym: M. aromaticus Povah
 Backusella tarrabulga Urquhart & Douch
 Backusella thermophila Hyang B. Lee et al.
 Backusella tuberculispora (Schipper 1978) G. Walther & de Hoog
Basionym: M. tuberculisporus Schipper 1978
Synonym: M. heterosporus sensu Baijal & Mehrotra; fide Schipper
 Backusella variabilis (A.K. Sarbhoy) G. Walther & de Hoog
Basionym: M. variabilis A.K. Sarbhoy
Synonym: M. grandis Schipper & Samson
Synonym: B. grandis (Schipper & Samson) G. Walther & de Hoog
 Backusella westeae Urquhart & Douch

Former species
The following species was at one point considered by some authorities to be in the genus Backusella, although this is no longer so:

 Mucor ctenidius (Durrell & M. Fleming) Pidopl. & Milko ex Benny & R.K. Benj.
Basionym: Thamnidium ctenidium Durrell & M. Fleming
Synonym: B. ctenidia (Durrell & M. Fleming) Pidopl. & Milko ex Benny & R.K. Benj.

See also

References

Further reading

 
 

Mucoraceae
Taxa described in 1969
Taxa described in 2012
Zygomycota genera